Andrea Gyarmati (born 15 April 1954) is a retired Hungarian swimmer. In 1972, she set a world record in the 100-meter butterfly. At the 1972 Olympics she won a silver medal in the 100-meter backstroke, and a bronze medal in the 100-meter butterfly. In 1995, following her both parents, she was inducted into the International Swimming Hall of Fame.

Biography
Gyarmati was born in Budapest. Her mother and coach Éva Székely was a 1952 Olympic champion in breaststroke, and her father Dezső Gyarmati was an Olympic champion in water polo. Gyarmati married and later divorced Mihály Hesz, an Olympic champion in canoe. 

She competed at the 1968 and 1972 Olympics in eight events in total, and won two individual medals in 1972 (a silver medal in the 100-meter backstroke, and a bronze medal in the 100-meter butterfly). In 1972 Gyarmati set a world record in the 100 m butterfly in the semifinals. She also won four medals (two gold) at the 1970 European Championships. For these achievements she was named Hungarian Sportswoman of The Year in 1970–1972. In her career, she won 28 Hungarian national championships and set two world records. In 1974, she walked out in the middle of a training session, said she had stopped enjoying competition,  refused to compete again, and instead became a pediatrician.

In 1995, following her both parents, Gyarmati was inducted into the International Swimming Hall of Fame.

See also
 List of members of the International Swimming Hall of Fame
 List of select Jewish swimmers

References

1954 births
Living people
Jewish swimmers
Hungarian Jews
Hungarian female backstroke swimmers
Hungarian female butterfly swimmers
Olympic swimmers of Hungary
Swimmers at the 1968 Summer Olympics
Swimmers at the 1972 Summer Olympics
Swimmers from Budapest
Olympic silver medalists for Hungary
Olympic bronze medalists for Hungary
World record setters in swimming
Olympic bronze medalists in swimming
Hungarian female freestyle swimmers
World Aquatics Championships medalists in swimming
European Aquatics Championships medalists in swimming
Medalists at the 1972 Summer Olympics
Olympic silver medalists in swimming